Alhambra Township is located in Madison County, Illinois, in the United States. As of the 2010 census, its population was 1,674 and it contained 634 housing units.

Geography

Local Government
The current mayor is Barbara Randle.

Demographics

References

External links
City-data.com
Illinois State Archives

Townships in Madison County, Illinois
Townships in Illinois